Flax palaui is a moth of the family Erebidae first described by Michael Fibiger in 2011. It is found in Micronesia (it was described from Babelthuap Island in Palau).

The wingspan is about 10 mm. The labial palps, head, patagia, tegulae, thorax and the ground colour of the forewings (including fringes) are dark brown. The base of the costa and the quadrangular narrow patch in the upper medial area of the forewing are slightly darker brown. The crosslines are indistinct. The terminal line is only indicated by dark-brown interveinal dots. The hindwings are light grey without a discal spot. The underside of the forewings is unicolorous brown and the underside of the hindwings is grey with a discal spot.

References

Micronoctuini
Moths described in 2011
Taxa named by Michael Fibiger